Josh Harris (born April 27, 1989) is an American football long snapper for the Los Angeles Chargers of the National Football League (NFL). He played college football at Auburn. He signed with the Falcons as an undrafted free agent in 2012. Josh attended Carrollton High School in Carrollton, Georgia, where he was a three sport athlete in football, wrestling, and baseball.

Professional career

Atlanta Falcons
Harris signed as an undrafted free agent with the Atlanta Falcons on April 26, 2012, following the 2012 NFL Draft. He was selected over veteran Joe Zelenka in the pre-season, when the roster was cut down to 53 players. He made his NFL debut in the Week 1 win against the Kansas City Chiefs.

On September 17, 2014, Harris signed a four-year contract extension with the Falcons.

In the 2016 season, Harris and the Falcons reached Super Bowl LI, where they faced the New England Patriots on February 5, 2017, losing 28–34 in overtime.

On November 2, 2018, Harris signed a three-year contract extension with the Falcons through the 2021 season.

On December 4, 2018, Harris was placed on injured reserve with a hip injury.

On September 1, 2021, Harris was waived from the Atlanta Falcons, only to be resigned the next day.

On December 22, 2021, Harris was selected to his first Pro Bowl.

Los Angeles Chargers
On March 16, 2022, Harris signed a four-year, $5.6 million contract with the Los Angeles Chargers.

References

External links

Auburn Tigers bio
Atlanta Falcons bio

1989 births
Living people
People from Carrollton, Georgia
Sportspeople from the Atlanta metropolitan area
Players of American football from Georgia (U.S. state)
American football long snappers
Auburn Tigers football players
Atlanta Falcons players
Los Angeles Chargers players
National Conference Pro Bowl players